is a song by Japanese musician Ringo Sheena. Used as the theme song for the drama Marumaru-zuma, it was released as a single on January 28, 2015.

Background and development 

On November 5, 2014, Ringo Sheena released her fifth studio album Hi Izuru Tokoro, her first after parting with her band Tokyo Jihen. Four of the songs featured on the album were used as Japanese television drama theme songs: "Ariamaru Tomi" for Smile (2009), "Carnation" for the morning drama Carnation (2011), "Jiyū e Michizure" for Ataru (2012) and "Irohanihoheto" for Kamo, Kyōto e Iku.: Shinise Ryokan no Okami Nikki.

Before the same time of the release of "Shijō no Jinsei", Sheena was also commissioned to write a song for boyband SMAP, which was used as the theme song for the drama Zeni no Sensō, a Japanese remake of the South Korean drama War of Money (2007) starring SMAP member Tsuyoshi Kusanagi. The song was released as a part of SMAP's single "Karei Naru Gyakushū" / "Humor Shichau yo" on February 18, 2015.

The song was written as a tribute to Marumaru-zuma screenwriter Kazuhiko Yukawa and the drama's production staff. Sheena considered the "light" of leading actress Kō Shibasaki as she created the song, and how Shibasaki's presence would affect the song. Sheena was inspired to write about how love reveals the true self. The phrase Shijō no Jinsei was a lyric originally found in her previous single "Nippon".

Promotion and release 

The song started airing as Marumaru-zuma'''s theme song from January 14, 2015 onwards. As the drama's theme song, it was used in promotional activities related to the drama. The physical single was released on February 25, a month before the video release of Sheena's concert tour Ringo-haku '14: Toshi Onna no Gyakushū. The song was performed at Music Station on February 27, and at Count Down TV on February 28.

 Music video 

A music video was recorded for the song, directed by Takumi Shiga. It was a video that incorporated both "Shijō no Jinsei" and the single's B-side "Donzoko Made", and featured Sheena and a band performing the songs in grayscale.

 Critical reception 

Shoichi Miyake of Rockin' On Japan felt the song's medium-tempo rock sound was reminiscent of songs from her debut era, such as "Mellow" (2000), and felt the song's chord progression, arrangement and earnestness was analogous to Radiohead's "Creep" (1992). Miyake noted that while the song was tailored for the drama Marumaru-zuma by Sheena, he felt it would become an essential part of her next original album, much like "Ariamaru Tomi" (2009), which had been written for the drama Smile, had become integral to Sheena's fifth studio album Hi Izuru Tokoro'' (2014). Yūichi Hirayama of EMTG called the song an "extremely heavy medium rock with an overwhelming energetic vocal performance by Ringo", praising the breathy vocals of the second chorus. He noted that the song was larger-than-life, however felt that such a song fit well with an also larger-than-life drama.

Track listing

Personnel

Personnel details were sourced from "Shijō no Jinsei"'s liner notes booklet.

Uni Inoue – manipulator
Masayuki Hiizumi – synthesizer
Yukio Nagoshi – guitar
Ringo Sheena – vocals, manipulator
Tom Tamada – drums 
Ukigumo – vocals (#2)
Hitoshi Watanabe – bass

Chart rankings

Sales

Release history

References 

2015 singles
2014 songs
EMI Music Japan singles
Japanese-language songs
Japanese television drama theme songs
Ringo Sheena songs
Songs written by Ringo Sheena